Roger Figueras Ballart (born 5 April 1997) is a Spanish professional footballer who plays for Lleida Esportiu as a central defender.

Club career
Born in Valls, Tarragona, Catalonia, Figueras represented Gimnàstic de Tarragona as a youth. On 20 August 2016 he made his senior debut with the reserves, starting in a 1–1 Tercera División home draw against EC Granollers.

On 7 August 2017, Figueras renewed his contract until 2020. He made his professional debut on 30 September of the following year, starting in a 1–3 home loss against Deportivo de La Coruña in the Segunda División.

On 23 July 2020, Figueras signed for AE Prat of the Segunda División B.

References

External links

1997 births
Living people
People from Alt Camp
Sportspeople from the Province of Tarragona
Spanish footballers
Footballers from Catalonia
Association football defenders
Segunda División players
Tercera División players
CF Pobla de Mafumet footballers
Gimnàstic de Tarragona footballers
AE Prat players